Magdalena Fularczyk-Kozłowska (born 16 September 1986) is a Polish rower. She is the 2016 Olympic double sculls champion with rowing partner Natalia Madaj. From 2009 to 2012, she rowed with Julia Michalska.

Career 
Fularczyk took up rowing after the persistent encouragement of one of her schoolteachers. At national level, she was initially coached by Martin Witkowski. Her first international success came at the 2002 Junior World Rowing Championships, where she and teammate Patrycja Pytel won the silver medal. With Kamila Socko, she won the bronze medal at the 2007 U-23 World Championships.

At the 2008 European Championships, she and Natalia Madaj won the silver medal in the double sculls; it was Fularczyk's first senior medal. She then teamed up with Julia Michalska.

When she won the gold medal at the 2009 World Championships with Julia Michalska, she was part of the first female Polish team to win a World Championship gold in an Olympic boat class.  Because of her achievements at the World Championships, Fularczyk was awarded the Knight's Cross of the Order of Polonia Restituta.

Fularczyk's preparation for the 2012 Summer Olympics was disrupted by a family tragedy and injury, but the team of Fularczyk and Michalska still won the bronze medal.  After this event, she returned to sculling with Madaj.

She also has a World Championship medal in the women's quadruple sculls (from the 2013 World Championships), with Sylwia Lewandowska, Joanna Leszczynska and Natalia Madaj.

As well as her international titles, she has also won four Polish national championships (single sculls 2009, double sculls 2006, 2007 and 2009, all with Julia Michalska).

At 2016 Summer Olympics Fularczyk-Kozłowska won her second Olympic and first gold medal in women's double sculls, in partnership with Natalia Madaj.

See also
 Poland at the 2016 Summer Olympics

References

External links
 

1986 births
Living people
Polish female rowers
People from Wąbrzeźno
Rowers at the 2012 Summer Olympics
Rowers at the 2016 Summer Olympics
Olympic rowers of Poland
Olympic gold medalists for Poland
Olympic bronze medalists for Poland
Olympic medalists in rowing
Medalists at the 2012 Summer Olympics
Medalists at the 2016 Summer Olympics
Sportspeople from Kuyavian-Pomeranian Voivodeship
World Rowing Championships medalists for Poland
European Rowing Championships medalists